Will Pan's Freestyle Remix 2005 is Taiwanese Mandopop artist Will Pan's first Mandarin remix album.  It was released by Universal Music Taiwan on 16 December 2005.

Track listing
 "決戰鬥室" [Battle Room]
 "誰是MVP" [Who's MVP]
 "高手" [The Expert]
 "一指神功" [Android]
 "背水一戰" 
 "快樂崇拜" (Adoration to Happiness) - duet with Angela Chang
 "壁虎漫步" [Gecko Stroll]
 "Wu Ha"
 "Tell Me"
 "我的麥克風" (Pass Me The Mic)

Bonus VCD
 "決戰鬥室"  [Battle Room] special version (MV) 
 "一指神功" [Android] (MV)

References

External links
  Will Pan discography@Universal Music Taiwan

Will Pan albums
2005 remix albums
Universal Music Taiwan remix albums